Borrelia recurrentis is a species of Borrelia, a spirochaete bacterium associated with relapsing fever. B. recurrentis is usually transmitted from person to person by the human body louse. Since the 1800s, the body louse has been known as its only known vector.

B. recurrentis DNA was found in 23% of head lice from patients with louse-borne relapsing fever in Ethiopia. Whether head lice can transmit these bacteria from one person to another remains to be determined.

It is notable for its ability to alter the proteins expressed on its surface, which causes the "relapsing" characteristic of relapsing fever.

References

recurrentis